Sullivan Lake may refer to:

Lakes
In Canada
Alberta
Sullivan Lake, Alberta
Nova Scotia
Sullivan Lake (Halifax)
Ontario
one of nine lakes with the name, including Sullivan Lake (Cochrane District), the source of the Misema River
In the United States
Sullivan Lake (Idaho)

Settlements
Sullivan Lake, a community in the County of Paintearth No. 18, Alberta, Canada